The Vancouver Playhouse Theatre Company was a regional Canadian theatre company, producing plays from 1962 to 2012. The following is a list of the productions that have been staged since its inception to its final season of 2011–2012.

2011–2012

Mainstage
Tosca Cafe (formerly The Tosca Project) – Created and staged by Carey Perloff and Val Caniparoli. An American Conservatory Theater (San Francisco) production.
La Cage aux Folles – Music & Lyrics by Jerry Herman. Book by Harvey Fierstein. Based on the play La Cage aux Folles by Jean Poiret.
Red – By John Logan. Directed by Kim Collier.
Catalyst Theatre’s Hunchback – Conceived by Jonathan Christenson and Bretta Gerecke. Adapted from Victor Hugo's novel. Originally commissioned by the Citadel Theatre (Edmonton).
God of Carnage – By Yasmina Reza. Translated by Christopher Hampton.

Recital Hall
Gunmetal Blues – Book by Scott Wentworth. Music & Lyrics by Craig Bohmler and Marion Adler.
The Exquisite Hour – By Stewart Lemoine - Not Presented. Presented instead at the Arts Club Theatre, Revue Stage.

Theatre for Young Audiences
The Cat Came Back – Co-Created by Fred Penner, Jay Brazeau and Kim Selody - Not Presented. Replacement concerts instead performed by Fred Penner and Friends at the Vancouver Playhouse and SFU Woodwards.

2010–2011
The Fantasticks – Book and Lyrics by Tom Jones; Music by Harvey Schmidt, Directed and Choreographed by Max Reimer
Noël Coward's Brief Encounter – Adapted for the stage by Emma Rice, Directed by Max Reimer
This – Written by Melissa James Gibson, Directed by Amiel Gladstone
Death of a Salesman – Written by Arthur Miller, Directed by John Cooper
The Trespassers – Written by Morris Panych Directed by Ron Jenkins
MacHomer – Created and Performed by Rick Miller

2009–2010
The Miracle Worker – by William Gibson (playwright)
Dirty Rotten Scoundrels – music and lyrics by David Yazbek and a book by Jeffrey Lane
Beyond Eden – by Bruce Ruddell
Delusion – by Laurie Anderson
The Love List – by Norm Foster
Dangerous Corner – by J. B. Priestley

2008–2009
Frost/Nixon – by Peter Morgan
The Drowsy Chaperone – book by Bob Martin and Don McKellar and music and lyrics by Lisa Lambert and Greg Morrison
Miss Julie: Freedom Summer – by August Strindberg, adapted by Stephen Sachs
Toronto, Mississippi – by Joan MacLeod
Top Girls – by Caryl Churchill
Studies in Motion – by Kevin Kerr

2007–2008
The Wars – by Timothy Findley
Oliver! – by Lionel Bart
The Blonde, the Brunette and the Vengeful Redhead – by Robert Hewett
The Amorous Adventures of Anatol – by Arthur Schnitzler
True West – by Sam Shepard

2005–2006
The Syringa Tree – by Pamela Gien
A Little Night Music – lyrics by Stephen Sondheim, book by Hugh Wheeler
Vincent in Brixton – by Nicholas Wright
I Am My Own Wife – by Doug Wright
No Great Mischief – by David S. Young

2004–2005
Joni Mitchell: River – by Allan McInnis
Noises Off – by Michael Frayn
Humble Boy – by Charlotte Jones
Copenhagen – by Michael Frayn
Trying – by Joanna Glass

2003–2004
Stones in His Pockets – by Marie Jones
Hello, Dolly! – book by Michael Stewart, music & lyrics by Jerry Herman
Arms and the Man – by George Bernard Shaw
One Last Kiss – by Aaron Bushkowsky
Equus – by Peter Shaffer
Cloud Tectonics – by Jose Rivera

2002–2003
Proof – by David Auburn
Fiddler on the Roof – book by Joseph Stein, music by Jerry Bock, lyrics by Sheldon Harnick
Mary's Wedding – by Stephen Massicotte
Romeo and Juliet – by William Shakespeare
The Caretaker – by Harold Pinter
Earshot – by Morris Panych
Asylum of the Universe – by Camyar Chai

2001–2002
The Edible Woman – by Dave Carley, based on the novel by Margaret Atwood
The Music Man – by Meredith Willson and Franklin Lacey
The School for Wives – by Molière
The Drawer Boy – by Michael Healey
The Rainmaker – by N. Richard Nash
The Dead Reckoning – by Aaron Bushkowsky

2000–2001
The Coronation Voyage – by Michel Marc Bouchard, translated by Linda Gaboriau
Guys and Dolls – music & lyrics by Frank Loesser, book by Jo Swerling
Wit – by Margaret Edson
Candida – by George Bernard Shaw
The Beauty Queen of Leenane – by Martin McDonagh
Game Misconduct – by Lesley Uyeda and Tom Cone
Kilt – by Jonathan Wilson
Dona Flora – by Electric Company

1999–2000
Of Mice and Men – by John Steinbeck
The Rise and Fall of Little Voice – by Jim Cartwright
She Stoops to Conquer – by Oliver Goldsmith
Patience – by Jason Sherman
The Bachelor Brothers on Tour – by Bill Dow and Martin Kinch
2 Pianos, 4 Hands – by Ted Dykstra and Richard Greenblatt
The Overcoat – by Morris Panych and Wendy Gorling

1998–1999
An Ideal Husband – by Oscar Wilde
The Attic, The Pearls and 3 Fine Girls – by Ann-Marie MacDonald, Alisa Palmer, Martha Ross
Billy Bishop Goes to War – by John Gray and Eric Peterson
Skylight – by David Hare
Tartuffe – by Molière
The History of Things to Come – by Morris Panych, Gary Jones and Shawn Macdonald
Suburban Motel – by George F. Walker

1997–1998
2 Pianos, 4 Hands – by Ted Dykstra and Richard Greenblatt
The Overcoat – by Morris Panych and Wendy Gorling
A Perfect Ganesh – by Terrence McNally
Atlantis – by Maureen Hunter
Mrs. Warren's Profession – by George Bernard Shaw
Picasso at the Lapin Agile – by Steve Martin

1996–1997
Ghosts – by Henrik Ibsen
Tons of Money – by Alan Ayckbourn
2000 – by Joan MacLeod
Who's Afraid of Virginia Woolf? – by Edward Albee
The Heiress – by Ruth Goetz and Augustus Goetz
Money and Friends – by David Williamson

1995–1996
Three Tall Women – by Edward Albee
The Importance of Being Earnest – by Oscar Wilde
The Crucible – by Arthur Miller
Later Life – by A. R. Gurney
Betrayal – by Harold Pinter
Dr. Jekyll & Mr. Hyde, A Love Story – adapted by James Nichol
True Mummy – by Tom Cone

1994–1995
Oleanna – by David Mamet
Charley's Aunt – by Brandon Thomas
Fronteras Americanas – by Guillermo Verdecchia
The Cherry Orchard – by Anton Chekhov
Waiting for the Parade – by John Murrell
Homeward Bound – by Elliott Hayes

1993–1994
Born Yesterday – by Garson Kanin
A Little of Wot You Fancy – by Susan Cox
If We Are Women – by Joanna McClelland Glass
The Relapse – by Sir John Vanbrugh
A Doll's House – by Henrik Ibsen
Struggle of the Dogs & the Black – by Bernard-Marie Koltès

1992–1993
The Millionairess – by George Bernard Shaw
The Wingfield Trilogy – by Dan Needles
Shirley Valentine – by Willy Russell
Lips Together, Teeth Apart – by Terrence McNally
Much Ado About Nothing – by William Shakespeare
Death and the Maiden – by Ariel Dorfman
Private Lives – by Noël Coward

1991–1992
A Moon for the Misbegotten – by Eugene O'Neill
The Miser Molière – adapted by Tom Cone
Love and Anger – by George F. Walker
Macbeth – by William Shakespeare
Fallen Angels – by Noël Coward
My Children! My Africa! – by Athol Fugard

1990–1991
A Streetcar Named Desire – by Tennessee Williams
The Heidi Chronicles – by Wendy Wasserstein
Hosanna – by Michel Tremblay
Pygmalion – by George Bernard Shaw
Other People's Money – by Jerry Sterner
Herringbone, The Musical – by Tom Cone, Skip Kennon and Ellen Fitzhugh

1989–1990
Hedda Gabler – by Henrik Ibsen
Blithe Spirit – by Noël Coward
We Won't Pay! We Won't Pay! – by Dario Fo
Shirley Valentine – by Willy Russell
Doc – by Sharon Pollock
Rock and Roll – by John Gray

1988–1989
A Lie of the Mind – by Sam Shepard
Nothing Sacred – by George F. Walker
The Glass Menagerie – by Tennessee Williams
Health, The Musical – by John Gray
Frankie and Johnny in the Clair de Lune – by Terrence McNally
Les Liaisons Dangereuses – by Christopher Hampton

1987–1988
A Midsummer Night's Dream – by William Shakespeare
Fire – by Paul LeDoux and David Young
B-Movie, The Play – by Tom Wood
Back to Beulah – by W. O. Mitchell
We, the Undersigned – by Aleksandr Gelman
The Dining Room – by A.R. Gurney Jr.

1986–1987
Noises Off – by Michael Frayn
Paracelsus – by George Ryga
Diary of Anne Frank – by Frances Goodrich and Albert Hackett
Private Lives – by Noël Coward
Master Class – by David Pownall
Foxfire – by Susan Cooper and Hume Cronyn
I'm Not Rappaport – by Herb Gardner
A Chorus Line.

1984–1985
A Man for All Seasons – by Robert Bolt
Terra Nova – by Ted Tally
Better Watch Out, You Better Not Die – by John Gray
Clarence Darrow – by David W. Rintels
The School for Scandal – by Richard Brinsley Sheridan
Cloud 9 – by Caryl Churchill
I'll Be Back Before Midnight – by Peter Colley

1983–1984
Death of a Salesman – by Arthur Miller
The Murder of Auguste Dupin – by J. Ben Tarver
Godspell – by Michael Tebelak
K-2 – by Patrick Meyers
The Tomorrow Box – by Anne Chislett
Amadeus – by Peter Shaffer
Terrace Tanzi: The Venus Flytrap – by Claire Luckham
North Shore Live – by Tom Wood, Nicola Cavendish and Bob Baker
The Guys – Jean Barbeau, translated by Linda Gaboriau
Win, Lose, Draw – by Mary Gallagher and Ava Watson

1982–1983
The Black Bonspiel of Wullie MacCrimmon – by W. O. Mitchell
The Dresser – by Ronald Harwood
A Gift to Last – by Gordon Pinsent, adapted by Alden Nowlan and Walter Learning
Mass Appeal – by Bill C. Davis
The Tempest – by William Shakespeare
A Funny Thing Happened on the Way to the Forum – by Stephen Sondheim, Larry Gelbart and Burt Shevelove
Dry Rot – by John Chapman
White Boys – by Tom Walmsey
Clarence Darrow – by David W. Rintels
As Loved Our Fathers – by Tom Kahill
Dylan Thomas Bach – by Leon Pownall

1981–1982
The Notebook of Trigorin – by Tennessee Williams
The Curse of the Werewolf – by Ken Hill and Ian Armit
Wings – by Arthur Kopit
Hunchback of Notre Dame – by Dennis Foon
Romeo and Juliet – by William Shakespeare
See How They Run – by Philip King
Billy Bishop Goes to War – by John MacLachlan Gray and Eric Peterson

1980–1981
The Servant of Two Masters – by Carlo Goldoni
The Red Devil Battery Sign – by Tennessee Williams
The Man Who Came to Dinner – by Moss Hart and George S. Kaufman
The Lady from the Sea – by Henrik Ibsen
Macbeth – by William Shakespeare
Dreaming and Duelling – by John Lazarus
The Tempest – by William Shakespeare
Much Ado About Nothing – by William Shakespeare

1979–1980
Jitters – by David French
Blithe Spirit – by Noël Coward
The Innocents – by William Archibald
Love for Love – by William Congreve
A Streetcar Named Desire – by Tennessee Williams
Henry VI, Part 1 – by William Shakespeare
As You Like It – by William Shakespeare
Gunga Heath – by Heath Lamberts

1978–1979
Hamlet – by William Shakespeare
A Flea in Her Ear – by Georges Feydeau
The Crucible – by Arthur Miller
Tales from the Vienna Woods – by Ödön von Horváth
Ghosts – by Henrik Ibsen
The Elocution of Benjamin Franklin – by Steve J. Spears
Midtown Aces – by Jesse Boydan
The Promise – by Aleksei Arbuzov
Endgame – by Samuel Beckett

1977–1978
Pygmalion – by George Bernard Shaw
Arsenic and Old Lace – by Joseph Kesselring
Oedipus (Swollen Foot) – by Seneca, adapted by Ted Hughes
The Contractor – by David Storey
Twelfth Night – by William Shakespeare
Ashes – by David Rudkin
A Respectable Wedding – by Bertolt Brecht
Jack Sprat – by Joe Wiesenfeld
Loot – by Joe Orton

1976–1977
Tartuffe – by Molière
Count of Monte Cristo – by Ken Hill
King Lear – by William Shakespeare
Travesties – by Tom Stoppard
Camino Real – by Tennessee Williams
Dirty Linen and New-Found-Land – by Tom Stoppard
The Blues – by Hrant Alianak
The Sound of Distant Thunder – by Christopher Newton
7 Under the 0 – by Allan Stratton

1975–1976
Equus – by Peter Shaffer
The Speckled Band – by Arthur Conan Doyle
Macbeth – by William Shakespeare
Leonce and Lena – by George Büchner
Camille – by Robert David MacDonald
Kennedy's Children – by Robert Patrick
Komagata Maru incident – by Sharon Pollock
Back to Beulah – by W. O. Mitchell
Dear Janet, Dear Mr. Kooning – by Stanley Eveling
Why Hanna's Skirt Won't Stay Down – by Tom Eyen

1974–1975
The Taming of the Shrew – by William Shakespeare
Harvey – by Mary Coyle Chase
The Adventures of Pinocchio – adapted by John Wood
Of the Fields, Lately – by David French
The Caucasian Chalk Circle – by Bertolt Brecht
And Out Goes You? – by Sharon Pollock
Frankenstein – adapted by Alden Knowlan and Walter Learning

1973–1974
Julius Caesar – by William Shakespeare
Leaving Home – by David French
Mr. Scrooge – music by Doroles Claman, book by Richard Morris and Ted Wood
Mandragola – by Niccolò Machiavelli
A Doll's House – by Henrik Ibsen
Dutch Uncle – by Simon Gray
Queer Sights, A Mouldy Tale – by Frank McEnaney

1972–1973
Forty Years On – by Alan Bennett
How the Other Half Loves – by Alan Ayckbourn
Treasure Island – by Robert Louis Stevenson
Lulu Street – by Ann Henry
Old Times – by Harold Pinter
Pillar of Sand – by Eric Nicol
Arms and the Man – by George Bernard Shaw

1971–1972
The Chemmy Circle – by Georges Feydeau
The Sorrows of Frederick – by Romulus Linney
Treasure Island – adapted by Bernard Miles
Crabdance – by Beverley Simons
Relatively Speaking – by Alan Ayckbourn
The Native – by Merv Campone
Hadrian VII – by Peter Luke

1970–1971
The Secretary Bird – by William Douglas-Home
Rosencrantz and Guildenstern Are Dead – by Tom Stoppard
Othello – by William Shakespeare
A Day in the Death of Joe Egg – by Peter Nichols
Plaza Suite – by Neil Simon
Hobson's Choice – by Harold Brighouse

1969–1970
The Royal Hunt of the Sun – by Peter Shaffer
The Show-Off – by George Kelly
Colours in the Dark – by James Reaney
Events While Guarding the Bofors Gun – by John McGrath
Village Wooing – and Dear Liar by George Bernard Shaw and Jerome Kitty
Tango – by Sławomir Mrożek
Staircase – by Charles Dyer
Che Guevara – by Mario Fratti
Foreplay – by Barry Friesen
The Candidate – by James Schevill
Space-Fan – by James Schevill
The Criminals – by Jose Triana

1968–1969
The Fourth Monkey – by Eric Nicol
Summer of the 17th Doll – by Ray Lawler
A Thurber Carnival – by James Thurber
Moby Dick-Rehearsed – adapted by Orson Welles
Mrs. Mouse Are You Within? – by Frank Marcus
The Filthy Piranesi – by William D. Roberts
Black Comedy – by Peter Shaffer
Grass & Wild Strawberries – by George Ryga
Fortune and Men's Eyes – by John Herbert
Tiny Alice – by Edward Albee
The Partition – by Jacques Languirand
Land Before Time – by M. Charles Cohen
The Visitor – by Betty Lambert

1967–1968
Androcles and the Lion – by George Bernard Shaw
The Ecstasy of Rita Joe – by George Ryga
The Beaux' Stratagem – by George Farquhar
Philadelphia, Here I Come – by Brian Friel
A Streetcar Named Desire – by Tennessee Williams
The Firebugs – by Max Frisch
Walking Happy – by Harold Brighouse
Listen to the Wind – by James Reaney
Three Rituals – by Ryūnosuke Akutagawa, Brian Shein and Sheldon Feldner
Requiem for a Dinosaur – by James Cruikshank

1966–1967
Candida – by George Bernard Shaw
Count Down to Armageddon – by James Clavell
Peer Gynt – by Henrik Ibsen
She Stoops to Conquer – by Oliver Goldsmith
How to Run the Country – by Paul St. Pierre
Anything Goes – by Cole Porter

1965–1966
Oh, What a Lovely War! – by Joan Littlewood
A Month in the Country – by Ivan Turgenev
The Knack – by Ann Jellicoe
Major Barbara – by George Bernard Shaw
The Typists & The Tiger – by Murray Schisgal
Romeo and Juliet – by William Shakespeare
Like Father, Like Fun – by Eric Nicol
Lock Up Your Daughters – adapted from Henry Fielding by Bernard Miles

1964–1965
Ring Round the Moon – by Jean Anouilh
Desire Under the Elms – by Eugene O'Neill
The Taming of the Shrew – by William Shakespeare
Christmas in the Market Place – by Henry Gheon
The Seagull – by Anton Chekhov
Oh Dad, Poor Dad, Mamma's Hung You in the Closet and I'm Feelin' So Sad – by Arthur Kopit
Stop the World – I Want to Get Off – by Leslie Bricusse and Anthony Newley

1963–1964
The Hostage – by Brendan Behan
Private Lives – by Noël Coward
The Boy Friend – by Sandy Wilson
Julius Caesar – by William Shakespeare
The Caretaker – by Harold Pinter
Charley's Aunt – by Brandon Thomas

References

External links
Vancouver Playhouse website

Canadian theatre company production histories
Theatre in Vancouver